The Timon David Fathers, officially known as the Congregation of the Sacred Heart of Jesus (abbreviated SCJ) is a Roman Catholic religious congregation of pontifical right. It was founded in 1852  by Joseph-Marie Timon-David.

History

Joseph-Marie Timon-David was a priest of Marseilles, concerned with the well-being of young workers. He observed that most of the young people had not received a basic religious training from their parents. He worked for some time with the Youth Movements of Abbé Julien, and then with Fatherr Allemand who worked with the lower middle class. In 1849, Bishop Eugène de Mazenod encouraged him to establish his own movement.

Following the example of Alexande-Raymond Devie, Bishop of Belley, Timon-David sought to simplify religious education and often used biblical stories, insisting on "education through the heart".

References

External links
Official website (in French)

Catholic religious institutes established in the 19th century
Religious organizations established in 1852
1852 establishments in France